Takeyasu Hirono (born July 18, 1971) is a Japanese mixed martial artist. He competed in the Flyweight division.

Mixed martial arts record

|-
| Loss
| align=center| 9-16-4
| Isao Hirose
| Decision (unanimous)
| Pancrase: Changing Tour 2
| 
| align=center| 2
| align=center| 5:00
| Tokyo, Japan
| 
|-
| Win
| align=center| 9-15-4
| Yoshihiro Matsunaga
| Decision (unanimous)
| GCM: Cage Force 9
| 
| align=center| 3
| align=center| 3:00
| Tokyo, Japan
| 
|-
| Loss
| align=center| 8-15-4
| Jesse Taitano
| KO (knee)
| PXC 14: Evolution
| 
| align=center| 1
| align=center| 0:00
| Mangilao, Guam
| 
|-
| Loss
| align=center| 8-14-4
| Tsuyoshi Okada
| Decision (split)
| Shooto: Grapplingman 6
| 
| align=center| 2
| align=center| 5:00
| Hiroshima, Japan
| 
|-
| Draw
| align=center| 8-13-4
| Tsuyoshi Okada
| Draw
| GCM: Cage Force EX Western Bound
| 
| align=center| 2
| align=center| 5:00
| Tottori, Japan
| 
|-
| Loss
| align=center| 8-13-3
| Yasuhiro Akagi
| Decision (unanimous)
| Shooto: Gig Central 10
| 
| align=center| 2
| align=center| 5:00
| Nagoya, Aichi, Japan
| 
|-
| Loss
| align=center| 8-12-3
| Yusei Shimokawa
| Decision (unanimous)
| Shooto 2006: 5/28 in Kitazawa Town Hall
| 
| align=center| 2
| align=center| 5:00
| Setagaya, Tokyo, Japan
| 
|-
| Win
| align=center| 8-11-3
| Jesse Taitano
| Decision (split)
| FFCF 4: Collision
| 
| align=center| 3
| align=center| 5:00
| Guam
| 
|-
| Win
| align=center| 7-11-3
| Oliver Moriano
| Submission (armbar)
| GCM: D.O.G. 3
| 
| align=center| 1
| align=center| 3:10
| Tokyo, Japan
| 
|-
| Win
| align=center| 6-11-3
| Keisuke Kurata
| Decision (majority)
| Shooto: Gig Central 8
| 
| align=center| 2
| align=center| 5:00
| Tokyo, Japan
| 
|-
| Loss
| align=center| 5-11-3
| Setsu Iguchi
| TKO (cut)
| GCM: D.O.G. 1
| 
| align=center| 2
| align=center| 5:00
| Tokyo, Japan
| 
|-
| Win
| align=center| 5-10-3
| Naoto Sato
| Submission (rear naked choke)
| GCM: CanD
| 
| align=center| 1
| align=center| 4:30
| Tokyo, Japan
| 
|-
| Win
| align=center| 4-10-3
| Minoru Tsuiki
| Decision (majority)
| GCM: Demolition 040711
| 
| align=center| 2
| align=center| 5:00
| Tokyo, Japan
| 
|-
| Loss
| align=center| 3-10-3
| Setsu Iguchi
| Decision (unanimous)
| GCM: Demolition 040408
| 
| align=center| 2
| align=center| 5:00
| Tokyo, Japan
| 
|-
| Loss
| align=center| 3-9-3
| Junji Ikoma
| Decision (unanimous)
| Shooto: Who is Young Leader!
| 
| align=center| 3
| align=center| 5:00
| Tokyo, Japan
| 
|-
| Loss
| align=center| 3-8-3
| Rambaa Somdet
| Decision (unanimous)
| Deep: 7th Impact
| 
| align=center| 3
| align=center| 5:00
| Tokyo, Japan
| 
|-
| Loss
| align=center| 3-7-3
| Homare Kuboyama
| Decision (unanimous)
| Shooto: Treasure Hunt 8
| 
| align=center| 3
| align=center| 5:00
| Tokyo, Japan
| 
|-
| Loss
| align=center| 3-6-3
| Homare Kuboyama
| Decision (split)
| Shooto: Treasure Hunt 4
| 
| align=center| 2
| align=center| 5:00
| Setagaya, Tokyo, Japan
| 
|-
| Win
| align=center| 3-5-3
| Tomohiro Hashi
| Decision (majority)
| Shooto: Treasure Hunt 1
| 
| align=center| 2
| align=center| 5:00
| Tokyo, Japan
| 
|-
| Loss
| align=center| 2-5-3
| Kentaro Imaizumi
| Decision (unanimous)
| Shooto: To The Top 10
| 
| align=center| 3
| align=center| 5:00
| Tokyo, Japan
| 
|-
| Loss
| align=center| 2-4-3
| Jin Akimoto
| Decision (unanimous)
| Shooto: To The Top 8
| 
| align=center| 3
| align=center| 5:00
| Tokyo, Japan
| 
|-
| Draw
| align=center| 2-3-3
| Hiroaki Yoshioka
| Draw
| Shooto: To The Top 1
| 
| align=center| 3
| align=center| 5:00
| Tokyo, Japan
| 
|-
| Loss
| align=center| 2-3-2
| Daiji Takahashi
| Decision (majority)
| Shooto: R.E.A.D. 7
| 
| align=center| 2
| align=center| 5:00
| Setagaya, Tokyo, Japan
| 
|-
| Loss
| align=center| 2-2-2
| Shuichiro Katsumura
| TKO (cut)
| Shooto: R.E.A.D. 4
| 
| align=center| 1
| align=center| 4:17
| Setagaya, Tokyo, Japan
| 
|-
| Loss
| align=center| 2-1-2
| Norio Nishiyama
| Decision (unanimous)
| Shooto: R.E.A.D. 1
| 
| align=center| 2
| align=center| 5:00
| Tokyo, Japan
| 
|-
| Win
| align=center| 2-0-2
| Masaru Gokita
| Decision (unanimous)
| Shooto: Renaxis 4
| 
| align=center| 2
| align=center| 5:00
| Tokyo, Japan
| 
|-
| Draw
| align=center| 1-0-2
| Jin Akimoto
| Draw
| Shooto: Gig '99
| 
| align=center| 2
| align=center| 5:00
| Tokyo, Japan
| 
|-
| Win
| align=center| 1-0-1
| Doc Chee
| Technical Submission (armbar)
| GCM: Vale Tudo
| 
| align=center| 1
| align=center| 4:38
| Japan
| 
|-
| Draw
| align=center| 0-0-1
| Mitsuhiro Sakamoto
| Draw
| Shooto: Las Grandes Viajes 4
| 
| align=center| 2
| align=center| 5:00
| Tokyo, Japan
|

See also
List of male mixed martial artists

References

1971 births
Japanese male mixed martial artists
Flyweight mixed martial artists
Living people